Musculus may refer to:
Andreas Musculus (1514–1581), German Lutheran theologian
Heinrich Musculus (b. 1868), Swedish-Norwegian businessperson
Wolfgang Musculus (1497–1563), German Reformed theologian
Musculus (bivalve), a genus of mussels
Balaenoptera musculus, the blue whale
Mus musculus, the house mouse